Sociedad Deportiva Sporting Sada is a football team based in Sada in the autonomous community of Galicia. Founded in 1951, it plays in the Preferente Autonómica – Group Norte. Its stadium is Campo de Fútbol As Mariñas with a capacity of 1,000 seats.

In New York City an amateur team playing in the Metropolitan Soccer League was another Sada F. C. composed mainly of young Spaniard immigrants. The present owner/manager of our Valencia team learned to play on this team.

Season to season

3 seasons in Tercera División

External links
Futbolme.com profile

Football clubs in Galicia (Spain)
Association football clubs established in 1951
Divisiones Regionales de Fútbol clubs
1951 establishments in Spain